Cantieri navali Odero (Shipyard Odero) is a defunct Italian shipyard. Founded in 1846 by the Westerman brothers in Genoa-Sestri Ponente, the company was taken over by Nicolò Odero in 1872. Together with the Ansaldo-San Giorgio shipyard at Muggiano and the armament works of Vickers-Terni, it was amalgamated into Odero-Terni by Attilio Odero, which, in turn, absorbed the Cantiere navale fratelli Orlando of Livorno two years later. The consolidated company became the Società per la Costruzione di Navi, Macchine ed Artiglierie Odero-Terni-Orlando (OTO) (later OTO Melara). The shipyard was closed in 1949.

Bibliography

See also 
 :Category:Ships built by Cantieri navali Odero

1846 establishments in Italy
Shipbuilding companies of Italy
Shipyards of Italy
OTO Melara